The 1947 St. Louis Browns season was the Major League Baseball franchise's 47th in the American League (AL) and its 46th in St. Louis. The 1947 Browns finished eighth and last in the league with a record of 59 wins and 95 losses, 38 games in arrears of the eventual World Series champion New York Yankees. The Browns were managed by Muddy Ruel in the former catcher's only stint as an MLB pilot, and drew only 320,474 fans to Sportsman's Park, 16th and last in the majors. On July 17, they became the third big-league team to racially integrate its ranks. However, the experiment failed when the two pioneer players, Hank Thompson and Willard Brown, were sent back to the Negro leagues in late August; the Browns would not field another African-American player until all-time great Satchel Paige joined them in July 1951.

Regular season 
 July 17: Hank Thompson became the first black player to appear in a game for the Browns.
 July 20: Hank Thompson and Willard Brown of the Browns played against the Boston Red Sox. It was the first time that two black players appear in a major league game together since 1884. In that first game of the double-header, outfielder Paul Lehner hit an inside-the-park grand slam to drive in all four runs in the Browns' 4-3 victory.
 September 28: Broadcaster Dizzy Dean comes out of retirement to pitch for the Browns.  He pitches 4 scoreless innings and hits a single.

Season standings

Record vs. opponents

Roster

Player stats

Batting

Starters by position 
Note: Pos = Position; G = Games played; AB = At bats; H = Hits; Avg. = Batting average; HR = Home runs; RBI = Runs batted in

Other batters 
Note: G = Games played; AB = At bats; H = Hits; Avg. = Batting average; HR = Home runs; RBI = Runs batted in

Pitching

Starting pitchers 
Note: G = Games pitched; IP = Innings pitched; W = Wins; L = Losses; ERA = Earned run average; SO = Strikeouts

Other pitchers 
Note: G = Games pitched; IP = Innings pitched; W = Wins; L = Losses; ERA = Earned run average; SO = Strikeouts

Relief pitchers 
Note: G = Games pitched; W = Wins; L = Losses; SV = Saves; ERA = Earned run average; SO = Strikeouts

Farm system 
LEAGUE CHAMPIONS: Belleville

References

External links
1947 St. Louis Browns team at Baseball-Reference
1947 St. Louis Browns season at baseball-almanac.com

St. Louis Browns seasons
Saint Louis Browns season
St Louis Browns